Manuel F. Araujo (1880–1940) was an early Brazilian film actor. He was prominent in Brazilian film in the 1920s and 1930s and in 1920 directed the film Convém Martelar  in which he worked with the touring famous Portuguese actor António Silva.

Filmography

External links and sources 

1880 births
1940 deaths
Brazilian male film actors
Brazilian male silent film actors
Male actors from Rio de Janeiro (city)